Benjamin Lay (January 26, 1682 – February 8, 1759) was an Anglo-American Quaker humanitarian and abolitionist. He is best known for his early and strident anti-slavery activities which would culminate in dramatic protests. He was also an author, farmer, vegetarian, and distinguished by his early concern for the ethical treatment of animals.

Born in England, into a farming family, his early trade was as a shepherd and glove-maker. After becoming a Quaker, he worked as a sailor, and in 1718 moved to Barbados. Here he witnessed the poor treatment of African slaves that instilled in him his lifelong abolitionist principles. Lay later settled in Philadelphia, and was made unpopular among his fellow Quakers by his confrontational anti-slavery stance. He published several pamphlets on social causes during his lifetime, and one book—All Slave-Keepers That Keep the Innocent in Bondage, Apostates—one of the earliest North American works against slavery.

Biography
Benjamin Lay was born in 1682 to Quaker parents in Copford, near Colchester, England. After working as a farmhand and shepherd, then an apprentice glove-maker, Lay ran away to London and became a sailor at age 21; he later returned to England and married Sarah Smith by 1718. In 1718, Lay moved to Barbados as a merchant, but soon his abolitionist principles, fueled by his Quaker radicalism, made him hugely unpopular with those fellow residents who broadly profited from slavery and human trafficking. In 1731, Lay emigrated to the British Pennsylvania colony, settling first in Philadelphia (in what is now the Olney neighborhood), and later in Abington. In Abington, he was one of the earliest and most zealous opponents of slavery, at a time when Quakers were not yet organized in opposition to slavery.

Lay stood barely over four feet tall, referring to himself as "Little Benjamin". He was a hunchback with a protruding chest, and his arms were as long as his legs. He was a vegetarian; he ate only fruits, vegetables, and honey, and drank only milk and water. He did not believe that humans were superior to non-human animals and created his own clothes to boycott the slave-labor industry. He would not wear anything, nor eat anything, made from the loss of animal life or provided by any degree by slave labor. Refusing to participate in what he described in his tracts as a degraded, hypocritical, tyrannical, and even demonic society, Lay was committed to a lifestyle of almost complete self-sustenance after his beloved wife died. Dwelling in the Pennsylvania countryside in a cave with outside entryway attached, Lay kept goats, farmed notably with fruit trees, and spun the flax he grew into clothing for himself. Inside the cave he stowed his library: two hundred books of theology, biography, history and poetry.

He was distinguished less for his eccentricities than for his philanthropy. He published over 200 pamphlets, most of which were impassioned polemics against various social institutions of the time, particularly slavery, capital punishment, the prison system, the moneyed Pennsylvania Quaker elite, etc.

Abolitionism

He first began advocating for the abolition of slavery when, in Barbados, he saw an enslaved man commit suicide rather than be hit again by his owner. His passionate enmity of slavery was partially fueled by his Quaker beliefs. Lay made several dramatic demonstrations against the practice. He once stood outside a Quaker meeting in winter with no coat and at least one foot bare and in the snow. When a passersby expressed concern for his health, he said that slaves were made to work outdoors in winter dressed as he was. On another occasion, he kidnapped the child of slaveholders temporarily, to show them how Africans felt when their relatives were sold overseas. The most notable act occurred in Burlington, New Jersey, at the 1738 Philadelphia Yearly Meeting of Quakers. Dressed as a soldier, he concluded a diatribe against slavery, quoting the Bible saying that all men should be equal under God, by plunging a sword into a Bible containing a bladder of blood-red pokeberry juice, which spattered over those nearby.

Friendship with Benjamin Franklin 

Benjamin Franklin had printed Lay's book All Slave Keepers That keep the Innocent in Bondage, Apostates, a polemic against slavery, and sold it for two shillings a copy, twenty shillings a dozen. He regularly visited in Lay's later years, after Lay had become a hermit. Franklin then owned a slave by the name of Joseph and by 1750 he owned two more slaves, Peter and Jemima. Lay pressed him for the justification: With What Right? In April 1757, Franklin drafted his new will in which he promised Peter and Jemima that they would be freed after his death.

As a gift to her husband, Franklin's wife Deborah Read commissioned William Williams to paint a portrait of Benjamin Lay (portrayed above). This portrait became known in the 18th century, but disappeared from view, until it was sold at auction in 1977 for four dollars, restored by conservators at the Winterthur Museum, and subsequently sold to the National Portrait Gallery in Washington, DC.

Death and legacy

Benjamin Lay died in Abington, Pennsylvania, in 1759. His legacy continued to inspire the abolitionist movement for generations; throughout the early and mid-19th century, it was common for abolitionist Quakers to keep pictures of Lay in their homes. Benjamin Lay was buried in Abington Friends Meeting's burial ground in a grave whose exact location is unknown, but next to the meeting house and adjacent to Abington Friends School in Jenkintown, Pennsylvania. In 2012, during the brief Occupy Jenkintown encampment, protesters symbolically rechristened the Jenkintown Town Square as "Benjamin Lay Plaza".

In 2018, the Pennsylvania Historical and Museum Commission erected an historical marker in Abington commemorating Lay. On April 21, 2018, Abington Friends Meeting unveiled a grave marker for Benjamin and Sarah Lay in its graveyard.

Four Quaker meetings had disowned Lay for his inconvenient campaigning. In 2018, Southern East Anglia Area Meeting, part of Britain Yearly Meeting, became the last of the four to "undisown" him. The others were Abington Monthly Meeting and Philadelphia Yearly Meeting in the USA and North London Area Meeting in Britain.

The Benjamin Lay room at Friends House, London, UK is named after him.

Publications

See also
Thomas Tryon, one of Benjamin Lay's influences; in the Williams painting, Lay is holding a copy of one of Tryon's works 
List of abolitionist forerunners

References

Further reading
 
 Rediker, Marcus (2017) The Fearless Benjamin Lay: The Quaker Dwarf Who Became the First Revolutionary Abolitionist, 
 Benjamin Rush: Biographical Anecdotes of Benjamin Lay. In: The Annual Monitor, or, New Letter-Case and Memorandum Book. vol. I. York 1815
 Richard Vaux: Memoirs of the lives of Benjamin Lay and Ralph Sandiford, two of the earliest public advocates for the emancipation of the enslaved Africans. Philadelphia 1815. London 1816.
 William Allan: An American Biographical and Historical Dictionary, containing an Account of the Lives, Characters, and Writings of the most eminent Persons in North America from its first settlement, and a summary of the History of the several colonies and of the United States Boston 1832
 John Hunt: Notices of Benjamin Lay. In: John Comly, Isaac Comly (eds.): Friends Miscellany. Being a Collection of Essays and Fragments, Biographical Religious Epistolary, Narrative and Historical. Designed for the Promotion of Piety and Virtue to Preserve in Remembrance the Characters and Views of Exemplary Individuals, and to Rescue from Oblivion those Manuscripts, Left by them which may be useful to Survivors. vol. IV,6. Philadelphia 1833, 274–276
 Lydia Maria Francis Child: Memoir of Benjamin Lay, Compiled from Various Sources. New York 1842
 Account of the life of Benjamin Lay, one of the early antislavery advocates. In: The Friend. A Religious, Literary and Miscellaneous Journal, vol. XXIX, 1856, 180f.
 Sarah Lay: Account of the life of Sarah Lay, given in connection with the biographical sketch of her husband, Benjamin Lay. In: The Friend. A Religious, Literary and Miscellaneous Journal, vol. XXIX, 1856, 180f.
 Biographical Anecdote of Benjamin Lay. In: Evert Augustus Duyckinck, George Long Duyckinck, Michael Laird Simons (eds.): Cyclopaedia of American literature embracing personal and critical notices of authors, and selections from their writings, from the earliest period to the present day, with portraits, autographs, and other illustrations. vol. I. Philadelphia 1856, 279–280
 Certificate for Benjamin Lay from Colchester Monthly Meeting, dated 12mo. 4, 1731, and addressed to Philadelphia Monthly Meeting. In: The Friend. A Religious, Literary and Miscellaneous Journal, vol. LIII, 1879, 135
 Benjamin Lay. Born 1677—died 1759—aged eighty-two years. In: W. Beck, W. F. Wells, H. G. Chalkley, H. G.: Biographical Catalogue, being an Account of the Lives of Friends and others whose Portraits are in the London Friends' Institute. Also descriptive Notices of Friends' Schools and Institutions of which the Gallery contains Illustrations. London 1888, 418–422
 John Hunt: "Anecdotes of Benjamin Lay". In: Journal of Friends' Historical Society, vol. XXII, 1925, 72f (from The Friend. A Religious, Literary and Miscellaneous Journal, vol. C, 1926, 18–19)
 "Benjamin Lay". In: The Journal of the Friends' Historical Society, vol. XXIII, 1/2, 1926, 59f.
 C. Brightwen Rowntree: "Benjamin Lay (1681–1759) of Colchester, London, Barbados, Philadelphia". In: The Journal of the Friends' Historical Society, vol. XXXIII, 1936, 3–19
 Stevenson, Janet Marshall: Pioneers in freedom. Adventures in courage. Chicago 1969
 William Kashatus III: Abington's Fierly Little Abolitionist. In: Old York Road Historical Society Bulletin, vol. XLV, 1985, 35–39
 Nathaniel Smith Kogan: "Aberrations in the Body and in the Body Politic: The Eighteenth-Century Life of Benjamin Lay, Disabled Abolitionist". In: Disability Studies Quarterly, 36(3), .
 Marvin Perry: Benjamin Lay. In: Alden Whitman (ed.): American Reformers. An H. W. Wilson Biographical Dictionary. New York 1985, 514–515
 Lay, Benjamin (1677–1759). In: Pennsylvania Biographical Dictionary. vol. I. Wilmington 1998 (2), 31–33
 Paul Rosier: Benjamin Lay. In: John Garraty, Mark Carnes (eds.): American National Biography. vol. XIII. New York 1999, 305–307
 Gil Skidmore: Benjamin Lay. 1683–1759. In: Dear friends and bretheren. 25 short biographies of Quaker men. Reading 2000, 19–21.
 Joseph Smith: A descriptive catalogue of friends' books, or books written by members of the society of friends, commonly called quakers, from their first rise to the present time, interspersed with critical remarks, and occasional biographical notices, and including all writings by authors before joining, and those after having left the society, whether adverse or not, as far as known. vol. I. London 1867, 92–93.

External links

 https://benjaminlay.org contains an online edition of Benjamin Lay's 1738 book, All Slave-Keepers: Apostates!'' 

 
 
  Text on Lay (13 pages)

1682 births
1759 deaths
17th-century Quakers
18th-century American male writers
18th-century English male writers
18th-century Quakers
American abolitionists
American animal rights activists
American anti–death penalty activists
American humanitarians
American pamphleteers
American male non-fiction writers
American Quakers
British anti–death penalty activists
British emigrants to Barbados
British emigrants to the Thirteen Colonies
British vegetarianism activists
Quaker abolitionists
English abolitionists
English activists
English humanitarians
English pamphleteers
English Quakers
Political activists from Pennsylvania
People from Colchester
People of colonial Pennsylvania
People with dwarfism